Keshan disease is a congestive cardiomyopathy caused by a combination of dietary deficiency of selenium and the presence of a mutated strain of Coxsackievirus, named after Keshan County of Heilongjiang province, Northeast China, where symptoms were first noted. These symptoms were later found prevalent in a wide belt extending from northeast to southwest China, all due to selenium-deficient soil. The disease peaked in 1960–1970, killing thousands of people.

Often fatal, the disease affects children and women of child-bearing age, characterized by heart failure and pulmonary edema. Over decades, supplementation with selenium reduced this condition.

It had been linked to the coxsackie B virus. Current research suggests that the lack of selenium results in a more virulent strain of the coxsackievirus becoming the dominant viral species present in the population of virus, but the mechanism of this selection event is unclear.

Keshan disease can also lead to higher rates of cancer, cardiovascular disease, hypertension, and strokes. In addition, an individual can experience eczema, psoriasis, arthritis, cataracts, alcoholism, and infections.

Signs and symptoms
There are four main types of Keshan disease: acute, subacute, chronic, and latent. 

Some signs and symptoms of acute Keshan disease include dizziness, malaise, nausea, chills, loss of appetite, projectile vomiting, pallor, low arterial blood pressure (less than 80/60 mmHg), dyspnea, precardiac (anterior to the heart) or substernal (behind or below the sternum) discomfort, cardiogenic shock, and constricted veins in one's extremities.

Some signs and symptoms of subacute Keshan disease include malaise, restlessness, gallop rhythm, facial edema, heart dilation, and cardiac shock.

Some signs and symptoms of chronic Keshan disease include palpitations, dyspnea, cough (with blood), pain in one's right upper quadrant, edema, oliguria, enlargement of the heart, systolic murmur, gallop rhythm, and hepatomegaly.

Some signs and symptoms of latent Keshan disease include dizziness, fatigue, palpitations, and mild enlargement of the heart.

Diagnosis

Prevention 

It is hard to consider Keshan disease extremely preventable because the only way to ensure that the individual is getting enough selenium would be to test the soil in the area. However, one way that selenium intake can be improved is to increase intake of foods that are rich with selenium. Examples include Brazil nuts, onions, canned tuna, beef, cod, turkey, chicken breast, enriched pasta, egg, cottage cheese, oatmeal, white or brown rice, and garlic. If the individual lives in an area that does not have selenium enriched soil, dietary supplementation should be considered. To determine whether or not an individual is selenium deficient, blood testing is performed.

Treatments 

The treatment for Keshan disease is selenium supplementation. The recommended amounts are fifty-five micrograms of selenium per day for adult men and women, sixty micrograms a day for women during pregnancy and seventy micrograms per day for women after pregnancy. A doctor may insist that if a man is sexually active, he may have to take up to seventy micrograms of selenium per day. A doctor may also recommend that the individual take vitamin E; selenium and vitamin E are medically linked and seem to work together. An individual will also be advised to have a diet that includes seafood, meats such as kidney, and liver, and some grains and seeds; all of these are high in selenium. Brewer's yeast and wheat germ both contain high levels of selenium. Garlic, onions, mushroom, broccoli, tomatoes, radishes, and Swiss chard may be good sources of selenium if the soil in which they are grown contains it. An individual will have to be monitored once they begin to take the selenium supplements, due to the fact that too much of it can cause balding, intestinal distress, weakness, and slow mental functioning. Individuals in China with the disease treat it with a herb called Astragalus, which accumulates selenium from the soil.

Living with Keshan disease 

An individual will most likely be prescribed selenium supplements (in the form of selenomethionine) or have injections of this mineral.  Other recommendations for managing Keshan disease are to increase consumption of foods rich in selenium in addition to supplements, avoid alcohol, monitor side effects to medications, and increase sleep.  Cardiac surgery (implants, stents or full heart transplant) may be advised.

See also
 Selenium deficiency
 Kashin–Beck disease

References

External links 

Heart diseases
Mineral deficiencies
Enterovirus-associated diseases